Kim Hwa-gyeong (born 18 July 1949) is a South Korean wrestler. He competed in the men's freestyle 48 kg at the 1976 Summer Olympics.

References

External links 
 

1949 births
Living people
South Korean male sport wrestlers
Olympic wrestlers of South Korea
Wrestlers at the 1976 Summer Olympics
Place of birth missing (living people)
Asian Games medalists in wrestling
Asian Games bronze medalists for South Korea
Wrestlers at the 1970 Asian Games
Wrestlers at the 1978 Asian Games
Medalists at the 1970 Asian Games
Medalists at the 1978 Asian Games
20th-century South Korean people
21st-century South Korean people